Kim Ki-bok (born 1944) is a former South Korean football player and manager. He was first manager of Jeonbuk Buffalo and Daejeon Citizen FC.

References

External links

1944 births
South Korean footballers
South Korea international footballers
Daejeon Hana Citizen FC managers
Korean Police FC (Semi-professional) managers
Living people
Asian Games medalists in football
Footballers at the 1966 Asian Games
Footballers at the 1970 Asian Games
Chung-Ang University alumni
Medalists at the 1970 Asian Games
Asian Games gold medalists for South Korea
Association football forwards
South Korean football managers